Kristaps Mauriņš (born 5 May 1991 in Cēsis) is a Latvian luger. He competed at the 2014 Winter Olympics, where he placed 21st in the men's singles event.

References

External links

 

1991 births
Living people
People from Cēsis
Latvian male lugers
Lugers at the 2014 Winter Olympics
Olympic lugers of Latvia